In algebraic geometry, Max Noether's theorem  may refer to the results of Max Noether: 

 Several closely related results of Max Noether on canonical curves 
 AF+BG theorem, or Max Noether's fundamental theorem, a result on algebraic curves in the projective plane, on the residual sets of intersections
 Max Noether's theorem on curves lying on algebraic surfaces, which are hypersurfaces in P3, or more generally complete intersections
 Noether's theorem on rationality for surfaces
 Max Noether theorem on the generation of the Cremona group by quadratic transformations

See also
Noether's theorem, usually referring to a result derived from work of Max's daughter Emmy Noether
Noether inequality
Special divisor
Hirzebruch–Riemann–Roch theorem